Anthony Patrick Grealish (21 September 1956 – 23 April 2013) was a professional footballer who played as a midfielder. Born in England to Irish parents, he represented the Republic of Ireland at international level.

Career
Born in Paddington, London, Grealish played club football for Leyton Orient, Luton Town, Brighton & Hove Albion, West Bromwich Albion, Manchester City, Rotherham United, Walsall and Bromsgrove Rovers. Grealish captained Brighton in the 1983 FA Cup Final.

He represented the Republic of Ireland at international level, captaining his country 17 times, scoring 8 goals in 45 appearances between 1976 and 1985. He also appeared in a total of 13 FIFA World Cup qualifying matches.

Grealish died on 23 April 2013, at the age of 56, from cancer.

Personal life
Grealish was the uncle of musician Example.

Honours
Individual
PFA Team of the Year: 1988–89 Fourth Division

See also
 List of Republic of Ireland international footballers born outside the Republic of Ireland

References

External links
 Ireland Career Stats
 Obituary from UEFA

1956 births
2013 deaths
English footballers
English people of Irish descent
Republic of Ireland association footballers
Republic of Ireland international footballers
Leyton Orient F.C. players
Luton Town F.C. players
Brighton & Hove Albion F.C. players
West Bromwich Albion F.C. players
Manchester City F.C. players
Rotherham United F.C. players
Walsall F.C. players
Bromsgrove Rovers F.C. players
English Football League players
Atherstone Town F.C. managers
Footballers from Paddington
Deaths from cancer in England
Association football midfielders
English football managers
FA Cup Final players